Raspreet Sandhu (born 15 September 1993) is an American professional footballer playing for Tampines Rovers FC as a forward or winger. As fielding more than three players is proscribed by the S.League regulations, he is allowed to play in the AFC Cup. So far he has made one assist in a 2-1 victory over Felda United.

College

Recording seven assists and three goals with the Sonoma State Seawolves, his attacking abilities were complimented by Sonoma State coach Marcus Ziemer who said 'his ball skills were outstanding', was 'quick' and 'agile' and had 'excellent vision'.
The American-born player is the first overseas Sikh to play in the S.League and was playing football at the age of two.

Career

Tampines Rovers

Over 30 family members watched the fixture versus Felda United in which he made his debut. Tampines Rovers president and director both were impressed by his football ability.

AFC Cup statistics

Personal life

His father Kalwant, a pious Sikh, played for Tampines Rovers FC in his time as a footballer. Later, Kalwant emigrated to Mountain View, California with his wife Pamela and Raspreet was born there as well as his two brothers, Hanspreet and Chandpreet.

References

External links
 

1993 births
Living people
American expatriate soccer players
American soccer players
American people of Singaporean descent
Association football forwards
Association football wingers
Expatriate footballers in Singapore
People from Mountain View, California
Singapore Premier League players
Sonoma State Seawolves men's soccer players
Soccer players from California
Tampines Rovers FC players